"Look Out Sunshine!" is a song by Scottish rock band The Fratellis from their second album Here We Stand. The song is the second single release from the album after "Mistress Mabel". The single was released on 18 August 2008 and peaked within the UK Singles Chart top 100 at number 70, marking the band's seventh single to appear in the UK top 75, but it fell off the chart the next week. On the Scottish Singles and Albums Chart, "Look Out Sunshine!" became the band's first (and to date only) number-one single and sixth top 10 hit, spending seven weeks in the top 100.

The money raised from the album went to the Teenage Cancer Trust to help build a new unit in Glasgow. The B-Side called "The Good Life" is bassist Barry Fratelli's first published song. The music video was uploaded to YouTube by Island Records on 22 July.

Track listing

This is listed on the iTunes Store as Look Out Sunshine! - EP.

This is listed on the iTunes Store as Look Out Sunshine! - EP with faded artwork.

Charts

References

The Fratellis songs
2008 songs
Songs written by Jon Fratelli
Island Records singles
Number-one singles in Scotland